Slouching Towards Bethlehem  is a 1968 collection of essays by Joan Didion and mainly describes her experiences in California during the 1960s.

Slouching Towards Bethlehem may also refer to:
"Slouching Toward Bethlehem" (Angel), an episode of Angel
"Slouching Towards Bethlehem", a song by Joni Mitchell from Night Ride Home
"Slouching Toward Bethlehem" (Defiance), an episode of Defiance

See also
The Second Coming (poem), a poem by William Butler Yeats that contains this line